Hong Mu (born December 18, 1924) is a Chinese former actress from Hong Kong and Taiwan. Mu is credited with over 15 films.

Early life 
On December 18, 1924, Mu was born in Beijing, China.

Career 
In 1955, Mu began acting in Taiwan. Mu appeared as a lead actress in By the Hillside, a 1955 film directed by Tsung Yu. In 1957, Mu began acting in Hong Kong. Mu is known for her lead role as Big sister Hilda Kong in Our Sister Hedy (1957) and Wedding Bells for Hedy (1959), both Hong Kong romance comedy films directed by Doe Ching. Mu appeared in Night of E-U-Tan, a 1958 Hong Kong film that was filmed on location in Taiwan. Mu appeared as a lead actress in Taiwanese films and a few Hong Kong films in the 1950s and early 1960s. Mu's last Hong Kong film was My Son, My Son, a 1961 drama film directed by Wang Win. Mu is credited with over 15 films.

Filmography

Films 
This is a partial list of films.
 1955 By the Hillside
 1957 Our Sister Hedy - Hilda Kong, Big sister.
 1958 Night of E-U-Tan
 1959 Wedding Bells for Hedy - Hilda Kong, Big sister 
 1960 A Shadow Over the Chateau - Lan Huizhu
 1961 My Son, My Son
 1962 Good Neighbors - Chen Wang-Aierh

References

External links 
 
 Mu Hong at china-underground.com

1924 births
Possibly living people
Chinese emigrants to British Hong Kong
Chinese expatriates in Taiwan
Hong Kong film actresses